Thomas Marcus Spriggs (born May 30, 1974) is a former offensive guard in the NFL. He played from 1997 to 2003 for the Buffalo Bills, Miami Dolphins, and Green Bay Packers.

References

1974 births
Living people
American football offensive tackles
American football offensive guards
Hinds Eagles football players
Houston Cougars football players
Buffalo Bills players
Miami Dolphins players
Green Bay Packers players
Players of American football from Mississippi
Sportspeople from Hattiesburg, Mississippi